Ross Richard Clark (born 25 October 1988), known professionally as Rylan, is an English broadcaster. He finished in fifth place on the ninth series of The X Factor in 2012, and the following year, he won the eleventh series of Celebrity Big Brother. He went on to present various television shows, including Big Brother's Bit on the Side (2013–2018), This Morning (2013–2019, 2022), The Xtra Factor (2016), Up Late with Rylan (2016), Supermarket Sweep (2019–2020), Ready Steady Cook (2020–2021), and You Are What You Wear (2020).

Early and personal life
Clark was born Ross Richard Clark on 25 October 1988 in Stepney, East London, to mother Linda Clark. He has a brother, Jamie. Clark is a supporter of West Ham United, having been a Junior Hammer as a child. He was educated at Coopers' Company and Coborn School in Upminster, East London.

Clark has been a part-time model since he was 16. It was during his early modelling career that he adopted the stage name "Rylan", which was conceived when he went into a branch of WHSmith and chose the name from the R section of a baby name book. In 2007, he applied for Big Brother 8, but, "the day I was going in, it got taken away from me because it got leaked to the press. It was devastating." He was in several Take That and Westlife tribute bands in Ibiza, and was also part of a Spanish boy band called 4bidden until 2010.

In September 2014, Clark got engaged to Big Brother 14 housemate Dan Neal. On 7 November 2015, the couple got married. On 27 June 2021, it was announced that the couple had separated after six years of marriage. Rylan lives in Stanford-le-Hope, Essex.

Career

2010–2012: Career beginnings
In 2010, Clark appeared in four episodes of the BBC series John Bishop's Britain. Clark was then a finalist on the Sky Living modelling series Signed by Katie Price. In May 2012, Clark auditioned for the ninth series of The X Factor at The O2 Arena in London in front of Louis Walsh, Gary Barlow, Tulisa and guest judge Rita Ora. He performed a dance version of Des'ree's "Kissing You". Afterwards, Barlow said: "Rylan, love your personality, hate your voice, really strange song choice as well." Walsh also admitted that he was "a bit worried". Barlow gave Clark a "no", but Ora, Tulisa and Walsh all decided to say "yes" and put him through to bootcamp.

At bootcamp, Clark sang The Pussycat Dolls' "Don't Cha" with former Pussycat Doll Nicole Scherzinger, who was then a judge. After his performance, Barlow admitted: "[I] think he's going to haunt me throughout this competition." Barlow was reluctant to send Clark through to judges' houses, however, the other three judges were in favour of him advancing. Clark was eventually put through into the boys category with Scherzinger as his mentor. At judges' houses in Dubai, he performed a stripped-back rendition of Rihanna's "We Found Love" in front of Scherzinger and Ne-Yo. Scherzinger later put Clark through to the live shows as one of her final three acts with James Arthur and Jahméne Douglas. She told him: "Rylan, it's such a big risk... but I have to take it, and you are in my final three", and he appeared to have an immense breakdown.

Clark sang "Gold" by Spandau Ballet in the first week of the live shows, and was in the bottom two with Carolynne Poole the following night. Scherzinger voted to save Clark, as he was her act, while Barlow and Tulisa voted to save Poole, based on their final showdown performance. Walsh, who had the casting vote, voted to save him, sending the result to deadlock, in which Clark had received more public votes than Poole and was saved, much to the disgust of Barlow, who stormed off stage and who later called Clark a "joke act" and "talentless".

In week 2, Clark persisted to annoy Barlow by first performing part of Barlow's "Back for Good" and then claiming that he had booked him a cab in advance in case he stormed off-stage again, to which Barlow responded "That's funny [because] I've had yours on hold for two weeks." That week, he was put through to week three on the public vote. In week 5, he was again in the bottom two with Kye Sones, but he was saved by the public vote. This happened after Barlow and Walsh voted to eliminate Clark, while Scherzinger and Tulisa, who had the casting vote, voted to eliminate Sones. Tulisa sent the result to deadlock and Sones was eliminated. In week 7, Clark revealed on The Xtra Factor that his psychic had told him that he would reach week 7 of the competition before leaving, however, the following night, he advanced to the quarter-final by the public vote, before being eliminated by the judges in week 8, with only Scherzinger voting to save him over Union J.

Celebrity Big Brother

Clark became a housemate in the eleventh series of Celebrity Big Brother in January 2013. He was the second celebrity to enter the Big Brother House. On launch night, Clark and Italian jockey Frankie Dettori selected which celebrities would join them in the House and who would be banished to the Basement. It was revealed midway through the series that, contrary to the show's rules of staying in the Big Brother House throughout the series, he had been leaving the house each Sunday to rehearse for The X Factor tour, which began a day after the live final on 25 January. He made it to the final five with Neil "Razor" Ruddock, Claire Richards, Ryan Moloney and Heidi Montag and Spencer Pratt. Clark was announced as the winner during the live final, after which he broke down into tears.

Channel 5 (2013–2018)
On 14 May 2013, as part of a revamp by Channel 5, Clark and AJ Odudu were announced as the new co-hosts of Big Brother's Bit on the Side, replacing Jamie East and Alice Levine. Emma Willis replaced Brian Dowling as host of Big Brother. In the 2015 series of Celebrity Big Brother UK vs USA, he also presented Bit on the Side on the weekends. For this series, the programme was renamed Bit on the State Side and filmed in an American-style studio. he presented Big Brother's Bit on the Side until the series was cancelled by Channel 5 in 2018.

In October 2015, Clark co-presented a special edition of Most Haunted Live with Jamie East on Really. In May 2016, he presented his own primetime chat show for Channel 5 called Up Late with Rylan.

ITV (2014–present)
Since the tenth series of The X Factor, Clark has provided all the gossip from the show on This Morning. He has also acted as a Hub presenter until its removal from the programme in 2014. Since late 2014, Clark has also been credited as the main relief presenter for the series. He has presented with others including Ruth Langsford, Lorraine Kelly, Dan Neal (his ex-husband), Alison Hammond, Phillip Schofield, Holly Willoughby, Amanda Holden, Sarah Greene, Geri Halliwell, Gok Wan, Lisa Snowdon, Emma Willis, Rochelle Humes and Eamonn Holmes. On 1 July 2016, it was confirmed that Clark would co-host The Xtra Factor Live with Matt Edmondson. This would be the second time that a former X Factor contestant has co-hosted the series, the first being Olly Murs, who had co-hosted from 2011 to 2012.

In January 2017, it was announced that Clark would present a new daytime game show for ITV called Babushka. He also hosted a non-broadcast pilot for ITV2 panel show Codswallop. However, it was not commissioned for a full series. In December 2017, it was announced that Rylan would be taking a break from his duties with This Morning from the following January for a few months. Clark returned to This Morning briefly in both April 2018, July 2018 and August 2018 as a main show stand-in presenter. On 10 July 2019, it was revealed that he would present a revived version of Supermarket Sweep. The first series aired on ITV2 on 9 September 2019 to 4 October 2019. The second series aired on 1 September to 19 December 2020, however, the show moved to its original channel ITV.

BBC (2018–present)
In 2018, it was announced that Clark would become a regular panellist on Eurovision: You Decide and he remained there until its cancellation in 2020. He also took over Mel Giedroyc's role as co-commentator for the Eurovision Song Contest semi-finals alongside Scott Mills. In 2018, he covered for Zoe Ball on BBC Radio 2, and took over her show when she moved to the station's breakfast show in January 2019, now titled Rylan on Saturday. Since January 2019, Rylan has also hosted multiple episodes of The One Show as a stand-in guest presenter.

On 18 April 2019, it was announced that Clark would begin co-presenting Strictly Come Dancing: It Takes Two with Zoe Ball. In May 2019, Clark was the spokesperson for the United Kingdom as part of the Eurovision Song Contest 2019. On 2 September 2019, it was confirmed that he would host a revived daytime series of Ready Steady Cook on BBC One in 2020 and in 2021, it was renewed for series 2.

On 10 January 2023, it was announced that Clark would co-host the semi-final allocation draw for the Eurovision Song Contest 2023.

Other work
In February 2014, Clark made a guest appearance in the Sky 1 comedy series Stella. In 2015, he reached the final of BBC One's Celebrity MasterChef. On 21 January 2016, he announced on Twitter that he would release his autobiography titled The Life of Rylan on 30 June 2016. It reached number 1 in The Sunday Times Bestsellers List. He appeared as Ryan, an air steward, in the 2016 film Absolutely Fabulous: The Movie. In 2017, he narrated the ITVBe reality series Spa Wars. In June 2020, it was announced that Clark would be co-hosting Big Brother: Best Shows Ever with Davina McCall.

Filmography

Awards and nominations

References

External links

Rylan On Saturday (BBC Radio 2)

1988 births
Living people
BBC Radio 2 presenters
English expatriates in Spain
English game show hosts
English male singers
English television presenters
English gay actors
Gay models
English gay musicians
LGBT DJs
English LGBT actors
English LGBT musicians
British LGBT singers
Musicians from Essex
People from Corringham, Essex
People from Stepney
Reality show winners
The X Factor (British TV series) contestants
20th-century English LGBT people
21st-century English LGBT people